De Laurentiis may refer to:

 De Laurentiis (surname), Italian surname
 Dino de Laurentiis Cinematografica, an Italian film-production company.
 De Laurentiis Entertainment Group , production company and film distribution unit founded by Dino De Laurentiis

See also 

 Laurenti
 Laurentius